HGBaquiran College, Inc., also referred to by its acronym HGB is a privately owned college and only college institution in Tumauini, Isabela, Philippines.

History

Honorato Guzman Baquiran College, also known as HGBaquiran College or HGB, is a private college located in Tumauini, Isabela. Since its establishment in 2005, the college has been known for providing high-quality education that prepares its graduates to be capable, engaged, and adaptable in addressing issues in both local and international communities.

The college is recognized by both the  Department of Education (DepEd) and the Commission on Higher Education (CHED) as a reputable institution. It offers a range of undergraduate programs, including teacher preparation, business administration, criminology, information technology, and hotel and restaurant management. Additionally, the college has a Senior High School curriculum that includes the Technical-Vocational-Livelihood (TVL) track, which offers strands in HE and ICT.

The college offers a variety of programs in different fields of study such as Business, Education, Technology, and many more. With its strong commitment to academic excellence, HGBaquiran College continues to attract students from different backgrounds. It provides them with the skills, knowledge, and values they need to succeed in their chosen careers.

Vision
A well-rounded human being, equipped with knowledge, values, attitudes, and skills that will enable/him/her to be locally and globally competitive, live a productive life, contribute to nation-building, and meet creatively and resourcefully the social and moral challenges of the world.

Mission
HGBaquiran College commits itself to offer quality education that shall develop well-rounded human being who possesses desirable values, attitudes, and skills thereby enabling him/her, to be locally and globally competitive, live a productive life, cope with the social and moral challenges of the modern world and able to contribute to nation building.

Academic Programs
College of Teacher Education
Bachelor in Elementary Education (G.P. No. 029 s. 2006 – CRO)
Bachelor in Secondary Education (G.P. No. 030 s. 2006 – CRO)
Bachelor of Arts (G.P. No. 035 s. 2006 – CRO)
College of Business Education
Bachelor of Science in Business Administration (G.P. No. 044 s. 2006 – CRO)
College of Criminology
Bachelor of Science in Criminology (G.P. No. 022 s. 2006 – CRO)
College of Information Technology
Bachelor of Science in Information Technology (G.P. No. 043 s. 2006 – CRO)

Gallery
HGBaquiran College, Inc. is celebrating its 18th founding anniversary, marking a significant milestone in the institution's history. Established in 2005, the college has been committed to providing high-quality education to its students. Over the years, the college has grown and expanded, offering a variety of programs in different fields of study such as Business, Education, Technology, and many more.

With a strong focus on academic excellence and student success, HGBaquiran College has become a respected institution in the region. The 18th founding anniversary is an opportunity to celebrate the achievements of the college and the contributions of its faculty, staff, students, and alumni. The celebration will include a variety of events and activities that will bring the community together to reflect on the past and look forward to the future of the college.

References

Universities and colleges in Isabela (province)

External links